is the name of three video games, one released for the Commodore 64 in 1990, one released for the TurboGrafx-16 in 1990 and the other for the NES in 1991 by Activision (not to be confused with the earlier DOS video game created by Dynamix in 1989). Its gameplay is based on the 1988 film of the same name. During the game, the player rescues hostages and battles with terrorists from a top view perspective at Nakatomi Plaza in Los Angeles.

Plot
John McClane decides to visit his wife Holly in Nakatomi Plaza, only to discover that she is taken hostage on the 30th floor, along with a number of other hostages. The terrorist leader, Hans Gruber, is after the money locked away in a safe on the 30th floor. His hacker, Theo, is slowly breaking the locks into the vault. McClane decides to fight the terrorists on his own, ascending the building as he does so.

Gameplay (NES)
There are 40 terrorists scattered throughout the building, and John McClane's task is to clear each floor of terrorists, and using the stairwell or the express elevator to travel between floors 31 and 35 (with more floors being unlocked in "Advanced" mode). By shooting at grids in the wall, John is also able to climb in the vents, dropping into a designated spot or moving down or up a floor.

At the start of the game, the player character can only use a pistol (with 15 bullets) and his fists to dispose of enemies, but later acquires several weapons, such as submachine guns, explosives, rocket launchers, flamethrowers and flashbangs which the terrorists can also use. When McClane is shot, a few picked up items can drop where he must pick them up again. The player's bullets have minimal range, and due to the control scheme can only be aimed at 90 or 45 degree angles. However once acquired, the submachine gun can also fire a spray of bullets in an arc, allowing for more firing angles. McClane's health, which is drained by bullet wounds, can be restored by collecting soda cans from either enemies, snack machines (by shooting several bullets at them) or empty rooms. The player loses the game when all life is lost.

The player has about four minutes before one of the six locks are opened, but can gain more time by destroying the main computer on the fourth floor. Once all the locks have been opened, the vault is opened and the game's final battle is triggered. The player has only a few minutes to go to the 30th floor, for a final confrontation with Karl, Hans, and any of the 40 terrorists left alive.

During the game, the player is initially aware of Hans shouting orders to his guards through a two-way radio. After the second lock is opened, Hans will tell everyone to not use the radio. Also notable is the "foot meter". The meter starts out full, but will eventually decrease if the player character steps on shattered glass or runs around. If the meter becomes empty, McClane will walk much slower than he does when the foot meter is full. It can be restored by collecting med-kits.

The game features cinematic sequences, which change the story depending on which actions the player takes. For example, if there is fewer than one minute left, and the player defeats Karl, the last scene with John and Holly will tell the player the roof has been destroyed by the helicopter sent by Hans.

Version differences
The Nintendo Entertainment System and TurboGrafx-16 versions of the game are played from a top-down perspective, as opposed to the 3rd-person perspectives seen on the Commodore 64 and DOS ports.

References

External links

1990 video games
Activision games
Action-adventure games
Christmas video games
Die Hard video games
Video games developed in Japan
Commodore 64 games
DOS games
Cancelled ZX Spectrum games
Nintendo Entertainment System games
TurboGrafx-16 games
Run and gun games
Pack-In-Video games
Shoot 'em ups
Third-person shooters
Top-down video games
Video games about police officers
Video games set in Los Angeles
Single-player video games
Video games with alternate endings
Video games about terrorism
Video games developed in the United States
Silent Software games